Albert Charles Marie Michelet (19 June 1869 – 30 July 1928) was a sailor from France, who represented his country at the 1924 Summer Olympics in Meulan, France.

References

Sources
 
 

French male sailors (sport)
Sailors at the 1924 Summer Olympics – Monotype
Olympic sailors of France
1869 births
1928 deaths
Sportspeople from Paris